Varija Bajaj is an Indian fashion designer from Delhi known for her women's workwear. Her "Pagdi" collection at India Runway Week in 2016, saw the models wearing the traditional Indian male headgear 'pagdi'.   Her "Vrindavan" collection premiered at India Runway Week in 2017. It was designed to counter the stigmas attached to widows.

Education
During the summer of 2000, Bajaj completed a Bachelor of Arts Honours in Philosophy from the Miranda House, Delhi. A year later she joined Diploma in Advertising and Marketing at Xaviers Institute of Communication, St. Xavier's College, Mumbai. She then moved to the University of Sheffield, UK for her master's degree in Business Administration.

Awards
Varija Bajaj is a recipient of the Delhi Gaurav Award for her contribution to the Fashion Industry. She is also the recipient of the Economic Times Labels Award for her brand Office & You. Being a successful entrepreneur in an unorganized sector, she is now a case study in Indian School of Business-Hyderabad.

Philanthropy
Varija Bajaj is Chairperson of NGO Varija Life, which works for the rights of disabled persons. Varija Life organized National Ability Summit to highlight opportunities for disability inclusion in diverse fields. Varija Life has also started inviting applications for research on adaptive clothing. Over 27 prominent colleges across India are part of the research. She is among the top 100 innovators by the World CSR Congress for her contribution to disability awareness.

Varija Life conducted the 2nd edition of NATIONAL ABILITY SUMMIT-2021, a virtual international conference for disability awareness in order to stir up action for an inclusive global society. It is the first time in the world that disability conversations encompass such a wide horizon with global experts from over 20 countries on occasion of International Day for Disability.

References

External links

Profile at Fashion Design Council of India

Year of birth missing (living people)
Indian women fashion designers
Living people
People from Delhi
Fashion stylists
21st-century Indian designers